Port Glasgow Athletic was a football club based in Port Glasgow, Scotland. The club was formed in 1878 and originally named Broadfield before changing their name in 1881. They played in the Scottish Football League between 1893 and 1911, and were based at Clune Park.

History
Originally based at Devol Farm, Port Glasgow, the club moved to a new ground called Clune Park on the town's Glasgow Road. The Port played for one season in the Scottish Football Alliance in 1891–92 and spent 1892–93 playing cup-ties and friendlies. They rejoined the Scottish Alliance for 1893–94, but before the new season, the Alliance was more or less absorbed by the Scottish Football League as its Division Two. During their first season in the Scottish League they had a record seven points deducted for rule infringements. For a time this left the club at the foot of the Division with −2 points.

After winning Division in 1901–02, the Port gained election into Division One. Despite struggling at the top level due to operating as an amateur club for most of the time, the club managed to stay in the division for eight years.

In the Scottish Cup, they reached the semi-finals in 1898–99 and 1905–06. On the latter occasion they knocked out Rangers in the quarter-finals. They also competed often in the Glasgow Cup. Their most well-known player was probably Gladstone Hamilton, the only player to be capped by Scotland while with the club. He played on the left wing for Scotland in the 1–0 win over Ireland in the 1906 British Home Championship. Two of his brothers were also Scottish internationalists though they played for Queen's Park. Gladstone later moved to England to join Brentford.

The club was relegated in 1909–10 and finished eighth in the 1910–11 Division Two table. Due to their precarious financial standing the club chose not seek re-election to membership of the Scottish League. After leaving the Scottish Football League, the club surprisingly joined the Scottish Football Union, but ceased operations as a senior side midway through the season. Apparently many of the players who were amateurs joined Port Glasgow Athletic Juniors. This club may have started out as the club's third team which they had put in the juniors in the 1890s.

Nickname and colours

The club was nicknamed "The Undertakers" – the reasons for this are somewhat confused. One explanation is the involvement of a local funeral director in the founding of the initial side or, more likely, they were known as the Undertakers because they originally played in black shirts, changing to white shirts with navy shorts and socks from 1882.

Honours
Scottish Football League
Division Two champions 1901–02

 Scottish Qualifying Cup
 Winners: 1897–98

 Renfrewshire FA Cup
Winners: 1884–85, 1894–95, 1895–96, 1899–1900, 1908–09

 West of Scotland League
 Champions: 1901–02

See also
:Category:Port Glasgow Athletic F.C. players

References

Sources
Dave Twydell (1993) Rejected FC Glasgow & District, Yore Publishing
John Aitken (2013) The Scottish Football League 125, Scottish Non League publishing
John Aitken (2005) West of Scotland Juniors, Scottish Non League publishing
John Aitken (2013) The Scottish Junior Football Association 125 years'', Scottish Non League publishing

External links
Port Glasgow Athletic at Fitbastats

 
Defunct football clubs in Scotland
Association football clubs established in 1880
Football in Inverclyde
Association football clubs disestablished in 1912
Scottish Football League teams
1880 establishments in Scotland
1912 disestablishments in Scotland